Out of the Darkness is a novel by British author Nigel Hinton. It was first published in 1998 and tells the story of a boy named Liam and a girl named Leila who were joined by fate and journey together.

Concept
The author liked the idea of young people on the run across Europe. The novel is also about the meaning of life.

Awards
The novel won the Stockport Schools' Book Award in 1999 and the Lancaster Book Award.

References

1998 British novels
Novels by Nigel Hinton